Wagner Francisco Cardoso (born 20 March 1989 in Rio de Janeiro) is a Brazilian sprinter specialising in the 400 metres. He finished seventh at the 2013 World Championships with the Brazilian 4 × 400 metres relay team.

His 400 metres personal best is 45.80, set in 2013.

Competition record

References

1989 births
Living people
Brazilian male sprinters
Athletes from Rio de Janeiro (city)
World Athletics Championships athletes for Brazil
21st-century Brazilian people